Pervomayskoye (Berense May) is a rural locality (a selo) in Kandrinsky Selsoviet, Tuymazinsky District, Bashkortostan, Russia. The population was 983 as of 2010. There are 13 streets.

Geography 
Pervomayskoye is located 30 km southeast of Tuymazy (the district's administrative centre) by road. Alexandrovka is the nearest rural locality.

References 

Rural localities in Tuymazinsky District